345 California Center is a 48-story office tower in the financial district of San Francisco, California. Completed in 1986, the  tower is the fifth tallest in the city after the Salesforce Tower, Transamerica Pyramid, 181 Fremont, and 555 California Street if the spires are included. It was originally proposed to be  taller. The building was developed by Norland Properties, a private real estate investment firm led by Hany Ben-Halim. 

345 California is in the middle of a block with historic buildings on each of the four corners. Initially planned as condominiums, the top 11 floors of the building are the Four Seasons Hotel San Francisco at Embarcadero, located in twin towers set at 45-degree angles to the rest of the building. Several glass skybridges offer views of the San Francisco Bay Area. The hotel has the street address 222 Sansome, with a different entrance.

Floors

The floors of the building are used as follows:

 38F - 48F: The Four Seasons Hotel San Francisco at Embarcadero
 4F - 36F: offices
 2F - 3F: retail and restaurants
 1F: Lobby entrance to the offices and hotel
 B2F-B1F: parking garage

Gallery

See also
List of tallest buildings in San Francisco

References

Further reading

External links
 Mandarin Oriental, San Francisco official website

Financial District, San Francisco
Office buildings completed in 1986
Skyscraper office buildings in San Francisco
Skidmore, Owings & Merrill buildings
Leadership in Energy and Environmental Design gold certified buildings